
Year 686 (DCLXXXVI) was a common year starting on Monday (link will display the full calendar) of the Julian calendar. The denomination 686 for this year has been used since the early medieval period, when the Anno Domini calendar era became the prevalent method in Europe for naming years.

Events 
 By place 

 Europe 
 Waratton, mayor of the palace of Neustria and Burgundy, dies and is succeeded by his son-in-law Berchar. He advises King Theuderic III to break the peace treaty with Pepin of Herstal, and declares war on Austrasia.

 Britain 
 King Cædwalla of Wessex establishes overlordship of Essex, and invades Kent for a second time. King Eadric is expelled, and Cædwalla's brother Mul is installed in his place. The sub-kings Berthun and Andhun are killed, and Sussex is subjugated by the West Saxons.    
 Cædwalla conquers Surrey, and tries to exterminate the Jutes of the Isle of Wight. He executes King Arwald and his two brothers. Cædwalla probably also overruns the Meonware, a Jutish people who live in the Meon Valley (Hampshire).

 Arabian Empire 
 August 6 – Battle of Khazir in Mosul: Alid forces of Mukhtar al-Thaqafi defeat those of the Umayyad Caliphate.
 Ubayd Allah ibn Ziyad, former governor of Mesopotamia, tries to regain control of his province, as the various Muslim tribes in the region Kufa (Iraq) are engaged in an Islamic civil war.
 Abd al-Malik ibn Marwan imprisons and tortures patriarch Mar Khnanishu I. He is the first caliph to insist on the collection of the poll tax from the Christians (approximate date).

 Asia 
 October 1 – Emperor Tenmu of Japan dies after a 13-year reign, and is succeeded by his widow (and niece), Empress Jitō. She will reign until 697.
 October 25 – Prince Ōtsu, son of Tenmu, is falsely accused of treason by Jito and forced to commit suicide, along with his wife Yamanobe.

 By topic 

 Religion 
 August 2 – Pope John V dies at Rome after a 12-month reign, in which he has made handsome donations to the poor. He is succeeded by Conon I as the 83rd pope of the Catholic Church.
 Plague kills almost all the Benedictine monks in the monastery of Monkwearmouth–Jarrow Abbey (Northumbria), aside from the abbot Ceolfrith and one small boy – future scholar Bede. 
 Wilfrid, bishop of York, becomes an advisor of Cædwalla, and is sent to the Isle of Wight to evangelise the inhabitants.

Births

Deaths 
 August 2 – John V, pope of Rome (b. 635)
 October 1 – Tenmu, emperor of Japan
 October 25 – Ōtsu, Japanese prince (b. 663)
 Andhun, king of Sussex 
 Arwald, king of the Isle of Wight 
 Audoin, bishop of Rouen (b. 609)
 Berthun, king of Sussex
 Eadric, king of Kent (approximate date)
 Eanflæd, queen of Northumbria (approximate date)
 Eata of Hexham, bishop of Lindisfarne
 Husayn ibn Numayr, Muslim general
 Landelin, Frankish abbot and saint 
 Waratton, mayor of the palace of Neustria
 Wonhyo, Korean Buddhist monk (b. 617) 
 Yamanobe, Japanese princess

References

Sources 

 
 

 

da:680'erne#686